Chthiononetes is a monotypic genus of Australian dwarf spiders containing the single species, Chthiononetes tenuis. It was first described by Alfred Frank Millidge in 1993, and has only been found in Australia.

See also
 List of Linyphiidae species

References

Linyphiidae
Monotypic Araneomorphae genera
Spiders of Australia